Tec-Mec (full name Studio Tecnica Meccanica) was a Formula One constructor from Italy. Founded by former Maserati designer Valerio Colotti in 1958, they participated in a single Grand Prix, scoring no World Championship points.

Tec-Mec used an improved, lightened version of the Maserati 250F, named the F415. The car was upgraded by the 250F's designer, Colotti, and financed by Lloyd Casner of Camoradi International. The team made its single outing in the 1959 United States Grand Prix, but the car, driven by Fritz d'Orey lasted six laps before retiring, having qualified 17th on the grid ahead of only the midget racer of Rodger Ward.

Colotti sold the design studio at the end of the year to found Colotti Trasmissioni, and the company continued to produce cars for the Formula Junior series.

Complete Formula One World Championship results 
(key)

See also
 Colotti Trasmissioni
 Valerio Colotti

References

Profile at Grand Prix Encyclopaedia
Results from Formula1.com

Formula One constructors
Formula One entrants
Italian auto racing teams
Italian racecar constructors
Vehicle manufacturing companies established in 1958
1958 establishments in Italy